Howick is a local government area in the eastern urban area of Auckland in New Zealand's Auckland Region, governed by the Howick Local Board and Auckland Council. It currently aligns with the council's Howick Ward.

Howick is the fifth largest local government area in New Zealand, after Christchurch, Wellington, Hamilton and Tauranga.

Geography

The area includes the large communities of Pakuranga and Howick, the newer suburbs of Botany and Flat Bush, and the area of East Tāmaki.

The swimming beaches of Cockle Bay, Howick Beach and Mellons Bay are located in this local government area. Other features include Howick Village, Mangemangeroa Reserve, Lloyd Elsmore Park, Te Tuhi Centre for the Arts, Botany Town Centre, Ormiston Road Bridge, Barry Curtis Park and Highbrook Business Park as well as Eastern Busway and Ormiston Town Centre.

References